The Lightning Thief is a 2005 American fantasy-adventure novel based on Greek mythology, the first young adult novel written by Rick Riordan in the Percy Jackson & the Olympians series. It won the Adult Library Services Association Best Books for Young Adults, among other awards. The novel is followed by The Sea of Monsters and spawned two sequel series (The Heroes of Olympus and The Trials of Apollo) and the extended universe of the Camp Half-Blood Chronicles.

A film adaptation of the book, titled Percy Jackson & the Olympians: The Lightning Thief, was released in the United States on February 12, 2010. On May 14, 2020, Riordan announced that a live-action TV series for Disney+ would adapt the Percy Jackson & the Olympians series, with the first season covering The Lightning Thief.

Plot

Percy Jackson is a dyslexic twelve-year-old with ADHD. While on a school trip to the Metropolitan Museum of Art, one of the chaperones, Mrs. Dodds, turns into a Fury and attacks him. Percy's favorite teacher, Mr. Brunner, lends Percy a magical sword-pen to defeat her. Percy and his mother Sally go to Long Island. Percy's friend Grover reveals himself as a satyr and warns of danger. At a summer camp, Sally is attacked by a minotaur and disappears in a flash of light. Percy kills the beast with one of its own horns. He learns that the camp is called Camp Half-Blood, and that he is a demigod: the son of a human and a Greek god. He settles into camp life and meets several other demigods, including Luke and Annabeth. After a hellhound attacks him, he is saved by Chiron and then claimed by his father, the god Poseidon. Chiron explains to Percy how the three eldest male gods—Poseidon, Zeus, and Hades—swore an oath not to have children; Percy represents a violation of the oath. He is the second violation of the oath, as the first was Thalia, daughter of Zeus. She was killed by monsters sent by Hades. This, coupled with the fact that Zeus's master lightning bolt has recently been stolen, has bred much suspicion between the gods.

Percy must locate Zeus's lightning bolt. Annabeth and Grover accompany him to the realm of Hades—the most likely culprit. Percy brings Chiron's magic sword Anaklusmos and Luke's flying sneakers. The trio travels to Los Angeles to visit Hades. Along the way, they are attacked by the Furies, Medusa, Echidna, and the Chimera. They perform a favor for the god Ares, who gives them a backpack full of supplies and safe transportation to Nevada. Percy learns more about his companions, his powers, and the world of the Greek gods. In Hades's realm, Grover is nearly dragged into Tartarus by Luke's flying shoes. The battered group finally meets Hades, who reveals that his Helm of Darkness has also been mysteriously stolen, and accuses Percy of stealing it. Hades threatens to kill his hostage Sally and reanimate the dead unless his helm is returned. When Percy finds the missing master bolt inside Ares's backpack, the group realizes they've all been manipulated by Ares. Narrowly escaping the Underworld, Percy challenges Ares to a duel on the beach. After a long and tough fight, Percy wins, and he gives the Helm of Darkness to the Furies. Hades realizes that Percy is not the thief of the helm nor the master bolt, and returns Sally home.

Percy takes the master bolt back to Zeus on Mount Olympus. Percy returns to Camp Half-Blood as a hero and enjoys the rest of his summer. On the last day of camp, however, he goes into the woods with Luke, who reveals himself to be the real thief of Hades's Helm and Zeus's bolt, following the orders of Kronos. Kronos had manipulated the power-hungry Ares into taking part in the scheme. Luke explains his beliefs that the gods are too irresponsible and are poor leaders who need to be overthrown. He offers Percy the chance to join him, and when Percy refuses, Luke tries to kill him with a scorpion. Percy is bit and faints. When he wakes up he is given a choice to stay in camp or finish the school year. He decides to spend the school year with his mother. Grover and Annabeth also leave the camp due to Luke.

Development and publication
Development for The Lightning Thief began when author Rick Riordan made up stories for his son Haley, who had been diagnosed with ADHD and dyslexia. His son had been studying Greek mythology in second grade and asked that his father come up with bedtime stories based on Greek myths. Riordan had been a Greek mythology teacher in middle school for many years and was able to remember enough stories to please his son. Soon Riordan ran out of myths and his son requested that Riordan make new ones using the characters from Greek myths with a new twist. Riordan created the fictional character Percy Jackson and his travels across the United States to recover Zeus' lightning bolt. In his new story, Riordan made ADHD and dyslexia part of a demigod's powers - respectively, heightened battle reflexes and a brain wired to read ancient Greek rather than English. After Riordan finished telling the story his son asked that his dad write a book based on Percy's adventures, and he did.

While he gave his manuscript to his agent and editor to review, Riordan took his book to a group of middle schoolers to critique. With their help, he came up with the name of the book and invented Percy's magic sword. Riordan first sent out the manuscript for The Lightning Thief under a pseudonym, as he did not want to rely on anyone in the publishing industry, who would have known him through his previous work. After many rejections, an agent picked up the manuscript as she liked its premise. In 2004 the book was sold to Miramax Books for enough money that Riordan could quit his job to focus on writing. The book has since been released in multiple versions (including hardcover, paperback, and audio editions) and has been translated and published all over the world.

Critical reception
The Lightning Thief received mostly positive reviews. The book has a rating of 4.25 out of 5 on Goodreads with over 1,900,000 reviews. Common Sense Media said, "There are two levels of fun in The Lightning Thief. One is the fast-paced quest of a young hero and his friends to save the world..." and added, "Another level of fun here – laughing at the wicked ways the author has updated the gods and monsters for the 21st century". However, it did criticize some aspects of the book, describing the prose as "choppy and attitude-filled" and complaining that "[t]he characters aren't emotionally involving". Its overall rating was 4 stars out of 5. Numerous other reviews were more positive. The New York Times praised The Lightning Thief as "perfectly paced, with electrifying moments chasing each other like heartbeats". School Library Journal said in its starred review that the book was "[a]n adventure-quest with a hip edge" and that "[r]eaders will be eager to follow the young protagonist's next move". Kirkus Reviews reviews said, "The sardonic tone of the narrator's voice lends a refreshing air of realism to this riotously paced quest tale of heroism that questions the realities of our world, family, friendship and loyalty." Eoin Colfer, author of Artemis Fowl called it "A fantastic blend of myth and modern". Finally, Publishers Weekly also praised the book, regarding it as "swift and humorous" and added that the book would "leave many readers eager for the next installment."

On April 8, 2007, The Lightning Thief was ranked ninth on The New York Times Best Seller list for children's books. The Lightning Thief was the winner of the School Library Journal Best Book of 2005 as well as one of the books in the Chicago Public Library Best of the Best Books List, 2005. It was also in the VOYA Top Shelf Fiction List and was the winner of the Red House Children's Book Award Winner (UK), 2006; Askews Torchlight Award (UK), 2006; and the Mark Twain Award (Missouri Association of School Librarians), 2008. It was an American Library Association Notable Book, 2006 and a New York Times Notable Book (2005). It received the Young Reader's Choice Award in 2008 and the Rebecca Caudill Young Reader's Book Award in 2009. Scholastic Parent & Child magazine also included the novel within its 100 "Greatest Books for Kids." When asked about the various awards, Rick Riordan said: "The ultimate compliment for a children's writer is when the kids like it."

Adaptations

Film adaptation

In June 2004, 20th Century Fox acquired the feature film rights to the book. In April 2007, director Chris Columbus was hired to helm the project. The film, titled Percy Jackson & the Olympians: The Lightning Thief, was released in the United States on February 12, 2010, and stars Logan Lerman as Percy Jackson, Alexandra Daddario as Annabeth Chase, Brandon T. Jackson as Grover Underwood, Jake Abel as Luke Castellan, and Pierce Brosnan as Chiron. The film received mixed reviews from critics upon release and grossed $226 million at the worldwide box office. Riordan criticized the movie for significantly altering the book's story, attempting to appeal to an older audience at the expense of the book's younger target demographic, making changes that would create problems for possible sequel films, and generally being poorly written. A sequel, Percy Jackson: Sea of Monsters, was released in 2013.

Audiobook
On June 28, 2005, a 10-hour and 25 minute audio book version, read by actor Jesse Bernstein, was published worldwide by Listening Library.

Kirkus Reviews magazine said, "the narrator's voice lends a refreshing air of realism to this riotously paced quest tale of heroism that questions the realities of our world, family, friendship and loyalty". AudioFile Magazine praised the audiobook, "adults and children alike will be spellbound as they listen to this deeply imaginative tale unfold." School Library Journal both praised and criticized the audio book saying "Although some of Jesse Bernstein's accents fail (the monster from Georgia, for instance, has no Southern trace in her voice), he does a fine job of keeping the main character's tones and accents distinguishable".

Graphic novel
The Lightning Thief was published as a graphic novel on October 12, 2010. It consists of 128 pages with cover art by Attila Futaki and Jose Villarrubia.

Musical

A one-hour musical aimed at young audiences was planned to hit the road on a nationwide tour in September 2014 following a stint in New York City in 2014. A two-hour version of the musical previewed Off-Broadway on March 23, 2017, at the Lucille Lortel Theatre. It officially opened on April 4, 2017, and ran until May 6 of the same year. On June 20, a cast recording was released on the Broadway Records label. In August 2017, it was announced that the two-hour long production would be going on a national tour beginning in the fall of 2018. In 2019 it was announced that the production would make its Broadway debut at the Longacre Theatre, running from September 2019 until January 2020.

Television adaptation

On May 14, 2020, Riordan announced that there would be a live-action Percy Jackson & the Olympians series made for Disney+. Unlike the earlier film adaptation, the series would follow the storyline of the books, and Riordan and his wife Becky would be involved in "every aspect of the show". The first season of the show would adapt the story of The Lightning Thief. On July 13, 2021, Riordan announced Jon Steinberg and Dan Shotz as the show's showrunners, and on January 25, 2022, the show was officially green-lit by Disney+. On April 11, 2022, Walker Scobell was announced to be playing Percy Jackson. In May 2022, Leah Sava Jeffries and Aryan Simhadri joined the cast, respectively playing Annabeth Chase and Grover Underwood. In June 2022, the casting of several secondary characters was announced.

Sequels

The Lightning Thief is followed by The Sea of Monsters, in which Percy and Annabeth rescue Grover, who has been taken by Polyphemus the Cyclops, and recover the Golden Fleece to save the camp. They are accompanied in this mission by Percy's Cyclops half brother, Tyson, and by Clarisse La Rue.

Like The Lightning Thief, it won several prizes and received generally positive reviews as well. It sold over 100,000 copies in paperback. It was followed by The Titan's Curse, The Battle of the Labyrinth, and The Last Olympian as well as an entire new sequel-series, The Heroes of Olympus, and later, The Trials of Apollo.

Foreign language editions
The Lightning Thief was published in Bulgarian, Romanian, Chinese, Italian, Turkish, Danish, Croatian, Czech, Finnish, French, Dutch, German, Hebrew, Portuguese, Brazilian Portuguese, Polish, Indonesian, Serbian, Norwegian, Swedish, Spanish, and Catalan. The French, German, and Spanish editions were published in 2006. The other translations of the book were published in 2008. The Icelandic publisher Odinseye released another edition in 2012. The novel is also on sale in Taiwan, published by Yuan Liou Publishing(遠流出版公司).

References

References

External links

 Rick Riordan Myth Master at publisher Penguin Books (UK)
 Percy Jackson & the Olympians at publisher Disney-Hyperion Books (US)
 

2005 American novels
2005 fantasy novels
2005 children's books
American fantasy novels adapted into films
Percy Jackson & the Olympians
Novels set in Long Island
Fiction about summer camps
Empire State Building in fiction
Cultural depictions of Medusa
Novels by Rick Riordan
Minotaur
Mark Twain Awards